This is a list of characters from Disney/Pixar's Toy Story franchise which consists of the animated films Toy Story (1995), Toy Story 2 (1999), Toy Story 3 (2010) and Toy Story 4 (2019), and Lightyear (2022). This list also includes characters from the Toy Story Toons series (2011–2012) and the television specials Toy Story of Terror! (2013) and Toy Story That Time Forgot (2014).

Introduced in Toy Story (1995)

Andy's toys
Andy Davis owns various toys who would also appear in later films. In Toy Story 3, Andy's remaining toys are donated to Bonnie.

Woody 

Voiced by:
 Tom Hanks (films, shorts, and specials)
 Jim Hanks (video games, Buzz Lightyear of Star Command: The Adventure Begins, and Lamp Life)

Woody is a 1950s old traditional pullstring cowboy doll, and Andy's favorite toy. Appearing in all four Toy Story films, he usually acts as the leader of Andy's toy group. He is extremely proud of his hat; in Toy Story 3, he is alarmed when he discovers that he has lost his hat. His rivalry with Buzz forms the basis of the first film's plot. In Toy Story 2, he is stolen at a yard sale by a toy collector named Al, causing the other toys to embark on a rescue mission. In the film, it is stated that he was the star of a 1950s television series titled Woody's Roundup. In Toy Story 3, he and the other toys are donated to a daycare center and must race to get home before Andy leaves for college; he later gets himself and the other toys passed on to Bonnie. In Toy Story 4, he joins Bo Peep in traveling with his new family and Forky. They also helped lost toys find owners and save Forky from running away.

Buzz Lightyear

Voiced by:
 Tim Allen (films, shorts, and specials)
 Pat Fraley (video games)
 Patrick Warburton (Buzz Lightyear of Star Command)
 Chris Evans (Lightyear)
 Javier Fernández-Peña (Spanish mode)
Buzz Lightyear is a modern-day "Space Ranger" action figure, and wears a green and white space suit with various features such as retractable wings, a transparent air helmet, a laser "weapon", and various sound effects. In the films, he acts as Woody's second-in-command. In Toy Story, he begins the series believing he is a real Space Ranger (the other toys are aware that they are toys) and develops a rivalry with Woody, who resents him for getting more attention as the newcomer. His catchphrase is "To infinity and beyond!" During the film, he comes to realize that he is just a toy, and eventually becomes good friends with Woody. He is extremely loyal to his friends. In Toy Story 2, Buzz with Mr. Potato Head, Hamm, Rex, and Slinky goes to save Woody from Al, where he gets stuck in the Buzz Lightyear aisle in Al's Toy Barn by another Buzz and finds out for himself what he was really like. In Toy Story 3, a relationship begins to develop between Buzz and Jessie. He is particularly open with his affection when switched to "Spanish mode".

Andy regards Woody and Buzz as his two favorite toys; in the third film, he considers which one he will take to college, and ultimately chooses Woody. When passing on his toys to Bonnie, he describes Buzz as "the coolest toy ever".

A 65-episode television series, Buzz Lightyear of Star Command, aired from 2000 to 2001, featuring Buzz as a real Space Ranger. The 2022 Pixar film, Lightyear, depicts the origin story of the character, which, in the narrative of Toy Story, inspired the line of Buzz Lightyear toys shown. In Lightyear, Buzz is shown to be a Space Ranger in Star Command, who is drawn into a conflict with Emperor Zurg after he experiences the effects of time dilation while testing faster-than-light travel methods.

Bo Peep

Voiced by Annie Potts (Toy Story, Toy Story 2, Toy Story 4, Lamp Life)

Bo Peep is a porcelain figurine who serves as Woody's romantic interest. Bo Peep, inspired by the nursery rhyme "Little Bo-Peep", is a sweet-natured shepherdess accompanied by a single figure meant to resemble three sheep named Billy, Goat and Gruff. In the first film, she and her sheep are detachable components of Molly's bedside lamp. In Andy's games of imaginative play, Bo Peep is used as the damsel-in-distress of the stories, and she is depicted as gentle, ladylike, and kindhearted.

After being given away prior to the events of Toy Story 3, in which Rex mentions that she had gone on to a new owner (which upsets Woody), Bo Peep returns with a major role in Toy Story 4. The film focuses on her relationship with Woody and she has a different philosophy on what it means to be a toy. Bo Peep no longer wears a skirt and her frills have been flattened out. She also wears a white bandage to fix her broken right arm and a purple bandage to fix her broken left hand.

Billy, Goat and Gruff
Voiced by Emily Davis

Billy, Goat and Gruff are porcelain sheep fused together that accompany Bo Peep.

Mr. Potato Head
Voiced by Don Rickles

Mr. Potato Head is a sarcastic, Brooklyn-accented doll based on the real-life Mr. Potato Head toy. His design allows him to detach parts from his body and he has a compartment on his lower back to store extra appendages. He retains control over his parts even if they are disconnected from his body. While this attribute is mostly used for comedic effect, it does have its uses, particularly in the second and third films. His wife is Mrs. Potato Head, and they become the adoptive parents to a trio of Aliens in the second film. In the opening scenes of the first and third films, he is described by Andy as the outlaw One-Eyed Bart.

Mr. Potato Head appears in the four main Toy Story movies. His voice actor, Don Rickles, had signed on for the fourth film, but died in 2017, before recording any lines. Rickles's family contacted the filmmakers and asked if there was a way to include his old vocal recordings in the film. The filmmakers went through 25 years of Rickles's unused Mr. Potato Head recordings – from the previous three films, the Disney theme parks, and the Toy Story video games – to use as the character's lines for the fourth film. According to director Josh Cooley, an editorial team "logged every word, every cough, every hum, just so we'd know what we had". Cooley worked with the film's screenwriters, Andrew Stanton and Stephany Folsom, to write general lines for the character, and then looked through the database of archived recordings to find a suitable dialogue match. Mr. Potato Head has seven lines and a laugh in the film.

Mr. Potato Head also appears in the theatrical short films Hawaiian Vacation, Small Fry, and Partysaurus Rex, and appears in Toy Story of Terror! and Toy Story That Time Forgot. He is seen as an interactive Audio-Animatronic at Toy Story Midway Mania!.

Slinky Dog
Voiced by:
 Jim Varney (1995–1999)
 Blake Clark (2010–present)

Slinky Dog is a toy dachshund with a metal Slinky for a body, who speaks in a gravelly southern accent. Slinky's head, feet, and a tail are plastic; he has a green collar. Slinky Dog was partially redesigned for the film by Pixar artist Bud Luckey to make him more appealing as an animated character. In the opening scenes of the first and third films, Slinky is described by Andy as One-Eyed Bart's "attack dog with a built-in force field".

Slinky Dog appears in Toy Story and Toy Story 2, voiced by Jim Varney. In Toy Story 3, Slinky was voiced by Blake Clark. His catchphrase is "Golly bob howdy!"

Slinky reappears in the short film Hawaiian Vacation, in which he acts as a hotel porter as part of Ken and Barbie's Hawaiian adventures. He also appears in Small Fry and Partysaurus Rex. He does not speak in Buzz Lightyear of Star Command: The Adventure Begins, silently appearing along with Jessie in one scene.

A ride, Slinky Dog Zigzag Spin, opened at several Disney theme parks beginning in 2010. Slinky Dog Dash, a steel roller coaster themed to Slinky Dog, opened at Disney's Hollywood Studios at Walt Disney World in 2018.

Rex
Voiced by:
 Wallace Shawn (most media)
 Jeff Bennett (Tiny Toy Stories)
 Earl Boen (Toy Story 2: Buzz Lightyear to the Rescue, Toy Story Racer)

Rex is an excitable large, green, plastic Tyrannosaurus rex with a lot of anxiety from an inferiority complex ("I just don't think I could take that kind of rejection!") and he is afraid he is not scary enough. Although Rex is a toy dinosaur, he dislikes confrontation and is sensitive in nature. He is among the largest of Andy's toys. In the opening scenes of the first and third films, he is described by Andy as Woody's "dinosaur who eats force field dogs", in reference to Slinky Dog. When passing his toys onto Bonnie at the end of the third film, Andy describes Rex as the "meanest, most terrifying dinosaur who ever lived".

Rex is voiced by Earl Boen (credited as "Earl Bowen") in the video games Toy Story 2: Buzz Lightyear to the Rescue (1999) and Toy Story Racer (2001). 

Rex appears in each of the Toy Story movies. He appears in an outtake of Monsters, Inc. where he waits at a crosswalk with the film's characters Mike and Sully. Rex reappears in the theatrical short films Hawaiian Vacation, Small Fry, Partysaurus Rex and in the TV specials Toy Story of Terror!, and Toy Story That Time Forgot. He also appears in the 2019 video game Kingdom Hearts III, with Shawn reprising his role.

Hamm

Voiced by:
 John Ratzenberger (primary voice actor)
 Andrew Stanton (Buzz Lightyear of Star Command: The Adventure Begins)

Hamm is a wisecracking realist plastic piggy bank. He has a cork in his belly in place of a stopper. He and Mr. Potato Head are friends, and are seen in the first film playing a card game, and later Battleship, which Hamm always wins. Out of all the toys, he is shown to have the most knowledge of the outside world, often being familiar with various gadgets that are shown. In the second and third films, Andy portrays Hamm as a villain known as "Evil Dr. Pork Chop". In the third film, Evil Dr. Pork Chop has a giant pig-shaped aircraft, which he uses to rescue One-Eyed Bart and One-Eyed Betty (the Potato Heads).

Hamm appears in each of the Toy Story movies. He appears in the post-credit scene of Cars as part of a homage and self-parody to Ratzenberger (who voices the Mack Super-Liner in the film). Hamm also briefly appears in Buzz Lightyear of Star Command: The Adventure Begins, voiced by Andrew Stanton. In a 2010 television advertisement for the United States Postal Service promoting Toy Story 3, Hamm wears a postal worker's outfit while promoting the Priority Mail service; Ratzenberger is best known for his role as mailman Cliff Clavin on the long-running sitcom Cheers. Hamm also makes an appearance in Toy Story 3: The Video Game as the mayor in Toy Box mode. Hamm appears in the theatrical short films Hawaiian Vacation, Small Fry and Partysaurus Rex, and also appears in the 2019 video game Kingdom Hearts III, with Ratzenberger reprising his role.

Sarge and the Bucket O Soldiers

Voiced by R. Lee Ermey (first three films)

Sarge (also known as Sergeant) is the gung-ho commander of green army men who are stored in a bucket and are known as Bucket O Soldiers. These toys play a prominent role in Toy Story and more minor roles in the next two films.

They also appear in the 2019 video game Kingdom Hearts III. A ride based on the soldiers, called Toy Soldiers Parachute Drop, is located at Disney theme parks in France and Hong Kong.

RC

RC is Andy's remote controlled buggy. He has a green body with blue splash decals on the front. RC cannot speak, instead communicating with revving sounds, which Mr. Potato Head and the other toys can understand regardless. RC is a playable character in Toy Story Racer. RC plays a major role in the first film, a very minor role in the second film and has a cameo appearance in the fourth film. He does not appear in the third film, except in footage showing Andy as a young boy. He was possibly one of the toys that went to new owners.

RC Racer, a roller coaster ride at several Disney theme parks, features RC transporting riders.

Andy's other toys
Andy has several toys who make brief appearances as minor characters:

 Rocky Gibraltar (voiced by Jack Angel) is a figure of a heavyweight wrestler. Rocky is silent and plays a minor role in the movies, but he can speak in the Disney Adventures comics and in the Disney Interactive games Disney's Animated Storybook: Toy Story and Toy Story Activity Center. Rocky's name and a logo on his championship belt are references to the Rock of Gibraltar. Rocky is a playable character in the Toy Story Racer video game.
  is an Etch A Sketch who can draw various images quickly and accurately. In the first film, it sketches a hangman's noose and shows it to Woody after the toys revolt against him for knocking Buzz out of a window. In the second film, it helps the other toys by initially sketching portraits of Woody's kidnapper and later sketching a map showing the location of Al's Toy Barn. It appears in Toy Story 3 only through footage of Andy as a young boy. It is stated by Woody that Etch was among several other toys of Andy's who went on to new owners.
 Lenny (voiced by Joe Ranft) is a pair of wind-up binoculars used by the other toys to get a better view during various situations in the first two films. He does not speak in Toy Story 2. He is a playable character in the Toy Story Racer video game. He also appears in Toy Story 3 through home video footage from when Andy was young.
 The Magic 8-Ball makes brief appearances in the first three films. In the first film, Woody asked the ball if Andy would pick him instead of Buzz Lightyear to take along with him to Pizza Planet, but the ball's reply was "Don't Count On It", upsetting Woody. Woody shoves the ball away, and it falls behind a desk. In Toy Story 3, a disinterested Molly tosses the ball into a box to be donated to Sunnyside daycare along with several other toys.
 Mr. Mike is a toy tape recorder who helped Woody amplify his voice during a toy meeting with his attached microphone. At the end of Toy Story 2, Wheezy uses him as a karaoke machine.
 Mr. Shark (voiced by Jack Angel) is a blue squeak toy shark who appears in the first two films. In the first film, he steals Woody's hat and imitates him before Woody takes his hat back. In Toy Story 2, he is used as one of the death traps during Andy's playtime. At the end of the film, he repairs Wheezy by finding him an extra squeaker.
  (voiced by Jeff Pidgeon) is a toy with a built-in keyboard who speaks words that are typed in. He makes brief appearances in the first two films, and it is stated that he has held toy seminars on topics such as plastic corrosion awareness and what to do if you or part of you is swallowed. In Toy Story 2, Buzz uses him to help figure out the identity of the man who stole Woody from the yard sale. He does not appear in Toy Story 3.
 Robot (voiced by Jeff Pidgeon) is a robot toy. In Toy Story, he stands on his head for Buzz to run on his treads like a treadmill. In Toy Story 2, he assists Buzz in making sure all of Andy's toys are accounted for once they learn of a yard sale. He is not seen again until the end of the film when he watches Wheezy sing "You've Got a Friend in Me". He only appears in Toy Story 3 through old home videos near the beginning of the film.
 Snake is a green and purple snake toy who communicates through hissing. It has brief appearances in the first two films, and only appears at the beginning of Toy Story 3 through old home videos.
 Troikas are a set of five non-talking egg-shaped toys that appear in Toy Story and Toy Story 2. They are various sizes, with one being able to fit inside another, like Matryoshka dolls.
 A troll doll with pink hair and a blue bathing suit appears in the first two films. In the first film, it became fascinated with Buzz and is also seen lifting weights with him. In Toy Story 2, it is seen alongside Bo Peep, helping search for Woody's hat before Andy takes him along to cowboy camp. It briefly appears in Toy Story 3 through old home videos of Andy as a child. A group of Troll dolls also appears in the third film's opening sequence, in which they are portrayed as orphans on a runaway train during Andy's playtime.
 Barrel of Monkeys are a barrel used to contain red monkeys, whose arms connect to each other. In a brief appearance, the monkeys are lowered by Andy's other toys out of the bedroom window in an attempt to retrieve Buzz, but the plan fails as there are not enough monkeys. They make brief appearances in the next two films during Andy's playtime. A Barrel of Monkeys is also briefly featured as one of Bonnie's toys in the short film Hawaiian Vacation.

Davis family

Andy Davis
Voiced by:
 John Morris (all four films)
 Charlie Bright (Andy in Toy Story 3)
 Jack McGraw (Andy in Toy Story 4)

Andy Davis is the former overarching protagonist of the films and the original owner of Woody, Buzz Lightyear and the other toys in the first three films. He lives with his mother and his sister Molly until the third film, when he goes to college after turning 17. His father is never seen or mentioned in the films. In Toy Story 2, Andy's mother calls Woody "an old family toy" and Prospector calls him a hand-me-down toy. John Lasseter said "we always thought" that Woody was "kind of a hand-me-down" to Andy from his father.

According to Toy Story producer Ralph Guggenheim in a December 1995 Animation Magazine article, John Lasseter and the story team for Toy Story reviewed the names of Pixar employees' children, looking for the right name for Woody's owner. Davis was ultimately named after and based on Andy Luckey, the son of animator Bud Luckey, Pixar's fifth employee and the creator of Woody.

The physical appearance of Andy differs slightly between each of the films due to advances in animation technology.

Mrs. Davis
Voiced by Laurie Metcalf

Mrs. Davis is Andy and Molly's mother. In the first film, she has brown hair and she ties it into a ponytail. In the other two films, her physical appearance is noticeably different and instead of brown, she has yellow hair and leaves it down. Mrs. Davis is presented as a loving mother to Andy and Molly, but is a major though indirect threat to the toys. Mrs. Davis's actions regarding the toys sets the plot in motion in the first three films, though they are not malicious. In the first film, she purchases a Buzz Lightyear toy for Andy on his birthday, prompting the rivalry between Buzz and Woody which leads to them being lost and forced to find their way home. In the second film, she puts Wheezy up for sale at a yard sale, prompting Woody's rescue attempt where he is subsequently stolen by Al. In the third film, she orders Andy to clean out his room before going to college and mistakenly throws away the toys Andy planned to put in the attic. Despite this, in the second film, she is very protective of Woody, describing him as an old family toy. At the end of the third film, she breaks down and weeps at the departure of her son, but Andy reassures her that she will always be with him even if they are apart. This moment between mother and son plays a major factor in Woody's decision to have Andy donate his toys to Bonnie, thus giving them a new lease on their lives.

Molly Davis
Voiced by:
 Hannah Unkrich (Toy Story 2 and archived footage in Toy Story 3)
 Bea Miller (Toy Story 3)

Molly Davis is Andy's younger sister, seen as a baby in the first film, a toddler in the second film, and as a preteen in the third film. Andy uses her crib as a town jail during playtime at the beginning of the first film, showing they share a room. When the family moves later in the film, Andy and Molly get separate rooms, though Molly has plans to move into Andy's room once he leaves for college. In the first film, she slobbers on Mr. Potato Head and throws him from the crib, causing his parts to scatter and earning her the nickname "Princess Drool" from him. At the end of the film, she receives a Mrs. Potato Head toy for Christmas. In Toy Story 3, she also owned a Barbie doll, which she donates to the daycare center as she was less interested in dolls and toys by that time.

In Toy Story 2, Molly was voiced by co-director Lee Unkrich's daughter, Hannah Unkrich. Lee Unkrich later re-used the recordings of his daughter to portray Molly during old home video scenes at the beginning of Toy Story 3.

Phillips family

Sid Phillips
Voiced by Erik von Detten

Sid Phillips is Andy's next-door neighbor until Andy moves away, but it is unknown if he and Andy know each other. Sid is known for torturing and destroying toys. Many of his toys are either destroyed or have pieces missing or replaced with parts from other toys. He is also shown tormenting his sister, Hannah, and destroying her toys, such as by blowing them up, burning them or decapitating them. He also enjoys skateboarding, and his shirt depicts a skull that would later be used as the logo for Zero Skateboards. Andy's toys mention that Sid was consistently kicked out of summer camp; and in the audio commentary on the 10th anniversary DVD, the directors mention that he is a bully but also the "most creative character in the movie". His parents do not make any major appearances: his mother's voice is only heard briefly several times in the film, and his father is only seen briefly asleep on a chair in front of a TV. He also has a Bull Terrier named Scud.

Sid is the only human character in the films to witness toys actually coming to life, when near the end of the first film, Woody and Sid's mutant toys decide to rescue Buzz by scaring Sid, which causes him to become very frightened of toys. The last straw is Woody coming alive while Sid is holding him and telling him to "play nice". This causes Sid to panic and run back into his house screaming, and then to his room when his sister scares him with her toy doll.

Sid does not appear in the second film, although he is mentioned once by Buzz during the toys' mission to rescue Woody from the toy collector Al McWhiggin. Sid also appears in the four-issue Monsters, Inc. comic mini-series produced by Boom! Comics.

In the third film, Sid makes brief appearances in two scenes once again voiced by Erik von Detten. He is shown to be a garbage man with a small beard, recognizable by his characteristic skull shirt. His only dialogue in this film involves humming guitar riffs, and he is depicted listening to heavy metal music through a pair of large headphones.

Hannah Phillips
Voiced by Sarah Freeman

Hannah Phillips is Sid's sweet-natured, younger sister who appears a few times in the film. Hannah has adjusted to her toys being mutilated by Sid. Most of her dolls either have different heads or altered body parts, and at the end of the film she finds enjoyment in scaring her brother after he has been horrified by Woody and the other toys. She spends most of the time during the movie playing with her altered dolls.

Sid's and Hannah's toys
The following toys belong to Sid and Hannah.

Hannah has several dolls, although some have been beheaded by Sid. During the film, one of Hannah's dolls, Janie, is taken by Sid, who switches her head with that of a toy Pterodactyl. Hannah also has a doll named Sally.

Sid has various mutant toys who are assembled by him from mixed pieces of several toys that belong to him and Hannah. Sid's mutant toys do not speak, but they understand Morse code. Buzz and Woody initially think that they are cannibals who are going to eat them, before they learn that the toys are actually friendly and compassionate. They fix Buzz's arm, Janie and the Pterodactyl, and also help Woody implement his plan to save Buzz from Sid. They surround Sid as Woody tells him how much they hate being mutilated, and they all rejoice in victory after Woody frightens Sid away with his own voice. After Sid is scared by his toys, he sees Sally, then runs off in fright, thinking that Sally will come to life. Sid's mutant toys include:

 Babyface  is a one-eyed baby doll head staked on top of a spider-like body with crab-like pincers made of Erector Set pieces. He is the leader of the mutant toys. Babyface is shown communicating with the other toys by banging in Morse code on the side of Sid's metal bedpost with his big claw. This method is used when he signals the other mutant toys to gather around to listen to Woody as he formulates his plan to rescue Buzz from Sid. When the mutant toys surround Sid, Babyface, suspended by Legs, lands on Sid's head, scaring him instantly. Babyface appears in Toy Story Treats, and is a playable character in the 2001 video game Toy Story Racer. In 2010, Disney released a remote-controlled Babyface toy.
 Legs is a toy fishing rod with doll legs. When Woody formulates his plan to save Buzz from Sid, he assigns Legs to partner up with Ducky. Legs opens the vent grating so she and Ducky can go to the front porch, where Legs lowers Ducky through the hole Ducky created so Ducky can swing toward the doorbell. After Ducky catches the Frog, Legs pulls both toys up to safety. Later, when the mutant toys advance on Sid, Legs lowers Babyface onto Sid's head, scaring him. Legs also appears in Toy Story Treats.
 A jack-in-the-box toy with a green arm that pops out. During Woody's plan to save Buzz from Sid, the toy extends its hand to Sid's doorknob, ready to open the door when the signal comes. The hand later grabs Sid's leg when the mutant toys surround him. The toy also appears in Toy Story Treats.
 Roller Bob is a jet pilot action figure, whose torso has been attached to a skateboard. After the Frog is let out of Sid's room to distract Scud, Roller Bob ferries Woody and the other mutant toys outside the house to Sid's yard.
 Rock Mobile  is the head of a toy insect attached on top of a small, headless human torso toy who is holding a steering wheel. This torso is attached in the head socket of a larger, muscular human torso toy that is missing its legs. 
 Pump Boy is a yellow convertible toy car with baby doll arms instead of wheels. It is capable of walking very fast and climbing walls. As part of the toys' rescue plan, Woody chooses Pump Boy to wind up the Frog to distract Scud. 
 The Frog is a tin wind-up frog with two different wheels instead of back legs. The Frog is also missing its left front foot. As part of Woody's plot to rescue Buzz from Sid, Woody orders, "Wind the frog!", at which point the Frog is wound up. When Ducky rings the doorbell, the Frog is let out of Sid's room, allowing Scud to chase him down the stairs and out to the front porch, where he is caught by Ducky; Legs reels both toys up to safety.
 Ducky is a triple toy combination: a duck-headed Pez dispenser with a baby doll torso and a plunger base. He and Legs go to the front porch via the vent, and Ducky, suspended from the porch ceiling by Legs, swings toward the doorbell until he finally activates it, giving Woody the signal to release the Frog. Ducky catches the Frog as Legs reels both toys up to safety.
 Jingle Joe is a Combat Carl head atop a toy based on a Melody Push Chime, with a severed Mickey Mouse arm nailed to the side for support. Jingle Joe first rolls out from under Sid's bed to fix Janie and the Pterodactyl. He notices Woody staring at them with a flashlight, so he turns it off, sending Woody running back to Buzz.

Additionally, Sid has a non-mutant soldier toy called , who is blown up by him with an explosive device. Combat Carl is Caucasian; a different character with the same name, who is African American, appears in Toy Story of Terror!.

Scud
Scud is Sid's henchman and aggressive Bull Terrier. First appearing when Sid blows up a Combat Carl in his backyard with an explosive, Scud is shown to have a malicious intent towards toys as he lashes out barking and helping his owner torture them. His viciousness is first demonstrated when Sid sets a squeeze toy Alien on his nose and commands him to maul it mercilessly. Scud is an obstacle for Woody and Buzz as they try to escape Sid's house. Scud later spots Woody and Buzz trying to reach the moving van and pursues them, but is eluded when he runs after them into the middle of a traffic intersection and is trapped by the cars as they crash while trying to avoid him.

Aliens / Little Green Men
Voiced by:
Jeff Pidgeon (primary voice actor)
Dee Bradley Baker (Tiny Toy Stories)
Patrick Warburton (Buzz Lightyear of Star Command)

The Aliens, also known as Little Green Men (or "LGMs") in the Buzz Lightyear of Star Command television series, are a series of green, three-eyed squeaky toy aliens. They appear in all four films. In Toy Story 2, three aliens become part of Andy's toy collection and are adopted by Mrs. Potato Head, although  Mr. Potato Head does not accept them as his own until he and the other toys are rescued from an incinerator by the aliens using a claw crane in Toy Story 3. In the third film, Mr. Potato Head refers to them as his boys, implying that all three are male.

In Toy Story, Buzz and Woody climb inside a giant rocket-shaped claw game at Pizza Planet. Inside the claw game are hundreds of squeeze toy aliens. When Buzz asks who is in charge, the Aliens say "the claw", which belongs in the machine, they say that the claw chooses who will go and who will stay. Sid wins an alien from the claw game, then spots Buzz and tries to win him too. Woody attempts to save Buzz and escape through the claw game's maintenance hatch, but the Aliens stop him and say that they must not fight the claw. Woody, Buzz, and the alien get taken to Sid's house. Sid gives the Alien to his dog, Scud, who violently chews it as Woody and Buzz watch in horror. Near the end of the film, the same Alien is seen to be intact as he walks like a zombie towards Sid, as part of Woody's plan to scare him.

In Toy Story 2, a trio of aliens are hanging above the dashboard in the Pizza Planet truck. Buzz groans when he sees them, remembering them. When the toys are having trouble getting the truck to move, the aliens tell Mr. Potato Head to use the wand of power, referring to the truck's gear lever. They nearly fall out of the window, due to the sharp turns from Buzz trying to catch Al in his car. Mr. Potato Head saves the aliens, and they are thankful to him. Throughout the rest of the film, they frequently say "You have saved our lives, we are eternally grateful," much to Mr. Potato Head's dismay. The Aliens join the quest to save Woody and mistake the entrance to the baggage area for the Mystic Portal. Back home, the trio, along with Bullseye and Jessie, end up becoming some of Andy's toys. They say their gratefulness to Mr. Potato Head, and Mrs. Potato Head is so happy that he saved their lives, she decides they should adopt them, with the Aliens calling Mr. Potato Head "Daddy".

In the opening sequence of Toy Story 3, the Aliens are portrayed by Andy as the henchmen under One-Eyed Bart and One-Eyed Betty (the Potato Heads), serving as the getaway drivers in a Chevrolet Corvette. In the present time, the trio continues to express their gratefulness to Mr. Potato Head. They are later donated to Sunnyside along with the rest of Andy's toys. In Sunnyside, the Aliens find a toy crane, which reminds them of the claw game in Pizza Planet. The Aliens get sat on and bounced on during a rough playtime with the toddlers. The toys plan to escape Sunnyside. The Aliens have to go through the playground with Woody and ride on Bullseye. They almost get caught by Big Baby because one of the Aliens falls off Bullseye and squeaks, but manage to hide inside a pail. Later when Andy's toys escape, one of the Alien's feet gets stuck in the lid of a dumpster. After Woody rescues the Alien, Lotso, who had been thrown into the bin by Big Baby, grabs Woody's feet and pulls him into the bin out of revenge just as the garbage truck arrives. The toys fall into the truck, which transports them to a landfill. The Aliens are separated from the others by a bulldozer when they wander off, having spotted a crane. They are later revealed to be in control of a giant claw crane, which they used to rescue the other toys from an incinerator after they were abandoned by Lotso. Mr. Potato Head finally acknowledges them as his children, reciting their repetitive line, "You have saved our lives and we are eternally grateful." The trio are later donated to Bonnie along with Andy's other toys.

They also appear in Toy Story 4.

They appear in the film Lightyear in a mid-credit scene as a statue on Commander Burnsides shelf.

The Aliens reappear in the theatrical short films Hawaiian Vacation, Small Fry and Partysaurus Rex, and the 2019 video game Kingdom Hearts III. The Aliens also have a ride at Disney theme parks called Alien Swirling Saucers.

Introduced in Toy Story 2 (1999)

Jessie 

Voiced by Joan Cusack

Jessie is a cowgirl doll, and part of the Woody's Roundup gang. In Toy Story 2, Jessie is initially hesitant to join Andy's toys due to her past experience with her owner Emily. After she becomes part of the family, she is very happy. In Toy Story 3, she believes Andy threw her and the other toys out; she argues with Woody, who tells the other toys that Andy was actually putting them in the attic; none of the other toys believe this until Mrs. Potato Head sees (through an eye that she misplaced in a corner in Andy's room) that Andy is looking for his toys and complaining that they are missing. Later in the film, Jessie becomes close with Buzz, especially when he is in Spanish mode. At the end, they dance to the Spanish version of "You've Got a Friend in Me". Jessie also appears in Pixar's 2013 television special Toy Story of Terror! as the main character that saves the other toys from the toy thief and seller at the rest stop.

Bullseye 
Bullseye is an extremely loyal toy horse and is part of the Woody's Roundup collection. In the fictional Woody's Roundup television series, Bullseye is portrayed as Woody's horse. In Toy Story 2, he was happy to finally see Woody after a long time in storage. Bullseye is shown to loathe fights as he hides in a can when Jessie jumps on Woody. He is also upset at Woody's intention to abandon the Roundup Gang to return to Andy. When Woody decides to return to Andy, it is Bullseye's loyalty that causes Woody to try to get the other Roundup toys to join him. Unlike most of the other toys, Bullseye cannot communicate in clear speech but sounds like an actual horse and uses body language to speak. He is also brave, gentle, sweet and rather sensitive.

Bullseye returns in Toy Story 3 as one of the remaining toys in Andy's room and has a small role in Toy Story 4. Bullseye reappears in the short films Hawaiian Vacation, Small Fry, and Partysaurus Rex.

Stinky Pete 
Voiced by Kelsey Grammer

Stinky Pete, commonly known as Prospector, is a prospector doll and one of the two main antagonists of the second film. He is a toy modeled after a character on the fictional television show Woody's Roundup, which also includes the characters of Woody, Jessie, and Bullseye. The Prospector doll seen in the film had never been opened and was still "mint in the box".

In contrast to the character on the show, Prospector is intelligent, ruthless, manipulative, and well-spoken. He openly expresses his hatred for space toys like Buzz Lightyear, whom he blames for causing Woody's Roundup to be cancelled after the launch of Sputnik (itself made in real-life by RSC Energia, and launched on the R-7 Semyorka-based "Sputnik" launcher by what is now the State Space Corporation "Roscosmos"), which made children all over America lose their interest in western toys, shifting to space adventures instead. Prospector believes the Roundup Gang should be put on display in a toy museum, as planned, stating that children destroy toys. He secretly disrupts Woody's escape attempt and frames Jessie for the sabotage. Later, he openly intervenes when Woody asks the Roundup Gang to come home with him. After a final confrontation at an airport, Andy's toys stuff Prospector into a backpack belonging to Amy, a little girl who takes him in as her new toy.

In one outtake, he is seen talking to two Barbie dolls in the box, saying that he could probably get them a role in the third film; this outtake was later deleted in the 2019 home media reissue, which media outlets inferred as a result of the Me Too movement. In another outtake, Prospector suffers a bout of flatulence and says, "I guess that's why they call me Stinky Pete."

Prospector appears in the Toy Box mode of Toy Story 3: The Video Game, although Grammer did not reprise the role.

Al's Toy Barn
The following toy characters are introduced in Al's Toy Barn, a chain of toy stores advertised on television in the first two films:

Utility Belt Buzz Lightyear
Voiced by Tim Allen

When searching for Woody at Al's Toy Barn, Buzz comes across the Buzz Lightyear aisle, including a display case labeled "New Utility Belt", which contains a newer Buzz Lightyear with a Utility Belt. He believes the original Buzz has escaped his box, and captures him inside one. He is then mistaken by Andy's toys to be the original Buzz and goes with them to rescue Woody (Utility Buzz is thinking he is going to Zurg), until he decides to join his father, Emperor Zurg.

Emperor Zurg
Voiced by:
 Andrew Stanton (Toy Story 2)
 Wayne Knight (Buzz Lightyear of Star Command: The Adventure Begins)
 Jess Harnell (mini counterpart in Small Fry)
 James Brolin (Lightyear)

Emperor Zurg is a robot alien villain action figure and Buzz Lightyear's archenemy. A thinly veiled parody of Darth Vader from the Star Wars franchise, he has red eyes with neon gritting teeth, gray horns on his head, and a purple tunic with a black cape on it. He usually carries an "ion blaster" that actually fires plastic balls. Zurg is mentioned in the first film, but does not appear. He debuts in Toy Story 2 where he battles with Utility Belt Buzz Lightyear. Zurg claims he is the father of Buzz, in an almost word-for-word homage to the famous scene in The Empire Strikes Back. He is knocked down the elevator shaft by one of Andy's toys, Rex. In Toy Story 3, another Zurg appears briefly during a sequence in the end credits, where he is donated to Sunnyside Daycare center and greeted by the resident toys.

Zurg also appears in Buzz Lightyear of Star Command and its direct-to-video film Buzz Lightyear of Star Command: The Adventure Begins as the main antagonist of both. Zurg is a playable character in the PlayStation 3 version of Toy Story 3: The Video Game, in Toy Box Mode. In the game, he has a convertible (the ZurgsMobile) that matches his personality. Zurg's mini counterpart is featured in the short film Small Fry.

A Zurg toy appears in the 2015 live-action Disney film Tomorrowland, in the Blast from the Past toy store.

In the 2022 spin-off film Lightyear, Zurg is revealed to be Buzz Lightyear who had traveled centuries to the effects of time dilation after having experienced faster-than-light speeds. Zurg reveals he is 50 years older than the protagonist Lightyear. Zurg is the sound his robot minions make in reference to him (B'Zurg). The now-aged Buzz, assuming the identity of Zurg, controlling a mecha suit, travels back in time to confront his younger self and fix a mistake Zurg Lightyear perceives he made. Zurg has become consumed with regret, resentment, and obsessed with his own "mission". He has utterly missed out on life, and blind to others experiences.

Barbie
Voiced by Jodi Benson

Barbie is a Barbie doll who gives Andy's toys a tour of Al's Toy Barn.

Rock 'Em Sock 'Em Robots
A pair of Rock 'Em Sock 'Em Robots appear in Al's office. When Slinky asks them if they have seen Woody, the two robots argue over which of them Slinky was asking. They fight each other in a boxing match, with the blue robot beating the red robot.

Al McWhiggin
Voiced by Wayne Knight

Al McWhiggin – nicknamed "The Chicken Man" by Andy's toys – is the owner of Al's Toy Barn and one of the two main antagonists of the second film. Al is first seen in Toy Story 2 during an advertisement of his toy store in which he is dressed up in a chicken suit. Al is a collector of all things related to the old Woody's Roundup television show. He is unscrupulously obsessive, overweight, extremely impatient, and lazy, as he complains of having to drive all the way to work on a Saturday, despite his apartment only being across the street from the store.

His car's license plate reads LZTYBRN, which is "Al's Toy Barn" minus the vowels and with a "Z" instead of a "S". This is how Buzz figured out that Al was the kidnapper of Woody. It is also the actual license plate of Ash Brannon, co-director of Toy Story 2, according to the Toy Story 2: Special Edition commentary.

Mrs. Potato Head
Voiced by Estelle Harris

Mrs. Potato Head is Mr. Potato Head's wife. Unlike her husband, Mrs. Potato Head is sweet and easygoing and not as hot-headed or impatient. She is mentioned in the first film, but is not seen until Toy Story 2. She has a larger role in Toy Story 3 as for most of the film, one of her eyes is lost in Andy's room, and it is through this eye that she sees Andy complaining that his toys are missing, causing the other toys to realize that Andy never intended to throw them away. She views the Aliens as her "babies", but her husband does not share this view until the Aliens save them from the incinerator. Mrs. Potato Head reappears in the theatrical short film Hawaiian Vacation and acts as a tour guide for Ken and Barbie in their Hawaiian adventures. She also reappears in Small Fry, Partysaurus Rex, and Toy Story 4.

Wheezy
Voiced by:
 Joe Ranft (speaking voice)
 Robert Goulet (singing voice)

Wheezy is Andy's squeeze toy penguin with a red bowtie. He is introduced when Woody finds him on a shelf, after Andy accidentally ripped Woody's arm and his mom took him, where Wheezy had been placed after his squeaker broke, upsetting Andy. Wheezy does not directly appear in Toy Story 3, except in footage showing Andy as a young boy. Woody says that Wheezy was one of Andy's toys who went to new owners. Wheezy appears in the Toy Box mode in Toy Story 3: The Video Game.

The Cleaner
Voiced by Jonathan Harris

The Cleaner is an elderly specialist in toy restoration and repair with a fully loaded toy repair kit. He comes to Al's apartment to fix Woody up in preparation of selling him to the toy museum. He insists that Al let him take his time with the work and views it as more than a simple job, asserting, "You can't rush art."

The character model was previously used to portray Geri (voiced by Bob Peterson) in Pixar's short film, Geri's Game, where he plays a chess game against himself. In Toy Story 2, one of the drawers in the cleaner's carrying case contains chess pieces, a reference to the short film.

Emily
Emily is Jessie's former owner and is mentioned by her in the film. She appears in a flashback song while "When She Loved Me" by Sarah McLachlan is played. As a young girl, she was a fan of Woody's Roundup and enjoyed playing with Jessie. However, as she got older, she became more interested in makeup and talking with her friends on the phone, causing her to forget about Jessie, who had fallen under her bed, for years. As a teenager, she rediscovers Jessie, but promptly donates her to charity, causing Jessie to develop claustrophobia and a fear of being abandoned.

In Toy Story 3, as Andy prepares to leave for college, and the toys begin to worry about their future, Jessie describes the situation as "Emily all over again."

Buster
Buster is Andy's pet miniature dachshund, mentioned at the end of Toy Story as his Christmas present. In Toy Story 2, Buster is very energetic but friendly. He obeys commands given to him by Woody (although he does not obey orders from Andy), who uses Buster to rescue Wheezy from a yard sale. In Toy Story 3, Buster is now old, visibly aged, and overweight. Because of that, he is unable to help Woody rescue Andy's other toys, instead falling asleep. He stays with Mrs. Davis while Andy goes to college.

Introduced in Toy Story 3 (2010)
The third film, Toy Story 3 (2010), features a total of 302 characters. The following notable characters appear in the film.

Sunnyside toys
The following toys live at the Sunnyside Daycare center:

Lots-O'-Huggin' Bear
Voiced by Ned Beatty

Lots-O'-Huggin' Bear (Lotso for short) is a plush, pink teddy bear with a big plum nose, a strawberry scent and a Southern accent. He is the main antagonist of the third film. He has a limp from falling off a truck in early years, and uses a wooden toy mallet as an assistive cane (although he is still able to walk without it). Lotso is the leader of the toys at the Sunnyside Daycare, and initially acts like a kind-hearted and wise caretaker, but is eventually revealed to be a ruthless and deceptive prison warden.

Lotso, Big Baby, and Chuckles once belonged to a little girl named Daisy, whom Lotso adored. When Daisy fell asleep and accidentally left them at a rest stop, Lotso led the toys on a long journey home, only to find that Daisy's parents had replaced him with a duplicate. Embittered beyond the point of sanity, Lotso lied to Big Baby that Daisy had replaced all of them, intimidated Chuckles (who knew the truth) into silence, and forced them both to come with him to Sunnyside. There, he established a totalitarian rule, forbidding any toys from leaving or escaping back to their owners and ensuring that the only way out is through the trash, which he believes is where all toys are destined. When Woody reveals Lotso's true character, all of Lotso's henchmen turn on him and Big Baby throws Lotso in the dumpster. Lotso, seeking revenge, pulls Woody into the dumpster, resulting in Andy's toys jumping in to save him just as the garbage truck arrives. All of them end up at the dump on a conveyor belt leading to an incinerator. Lotso, getting free with Woody and Buzz's help, reaches an emergency stop button, but decides at the last minute to abandon the others to be burned so that they can't return to Andy, as his beliefs remain unchanged. Unbeknownst to Lotso; however, his efforts are in vain as Andy's toys are saved by the Aliens using a giant claw. Hamm and Slinky wish to avenge themselves on Lotso for his betrayal, but Woody convinces them he isn't worth it, knowing that the dump is where he belongs. Lotso, meanwhile, attempts to escape the dump, but a garbage man (who had owned a Lots-O'-Huggin' Bear during his childhood) finds Lotso and straps him to the grill of his truck as a decoration.

Lotso was intended to be in the first film, but the technology to represent realistic fur was not available until 2001's Monsters, Inc. An early version of Lotso makes a brief appearance in the first film, and can be seen in the second film during the first Al's Toy Barn commercial. A Lotso bear also makes a cameo appearance in Pixar's 2009 film Up.

Ned Beatty was nominated for an MTV Movie Award for Best Villain for his performance as Lotso, and IGN named Lotso the best villain of the summer of 2010.

Ken
Voiced by Michael Keaton

Ken is a smooth-talking doll, who falls in love with Barbie at first sight. He first appears wearing light blue pleated and cuffed shorts, and a tucked-in leopard-print shirt with short sleeves. His accessories include matching ascot, sensible loafers and a fashion-forward gold belt. He lives in Ken's Dreamhouse, a big yellow doll house with three stories, a large wardrobe room, and an elevator. His appearance is based on a real Mattel Ken doll from 1988 called Animal Lovin' Ken.

Ken serves as a supporting antagonist for most of the third film, but later reforms. He was originally one of Lotso's henchmen, which caused a temporary strain in his relationship with Barbie. After understanding Lotso's true character, he immediately turns against him, and encourages the rest of Lotso's henchmen to do the same. After Lotso's defeat, he and Barbie renew their relationship and become the new leaders of Sunnyside's toy population, keeping in touch with Bonnie's toys through letters sent home in Bonnie's backpack. He and Barbie later come to visit Bonnie's House in Hawaiian Vacation.

Big Baby
Voiced by Woody Smith

Big Baby is a baby doll with a lazy eye who carries around a bottle and is adorned with childlike scribbling that resembles ferocious tattoos. He is a supporting antagonist for most of the third film, but later reforms. As a sentient toy, he has the biological traits of a human infant. He normally does not speak, instead communicating through baby sounds, with the exception of one spoken line ("Mama") after the toys escape Sunnyside. He acts as Lotso's assistant and enforcer, who helps guide the new toys around, and punishes them when they misbehave. He, Lotso and Chuckles were all once owned by Daisy before they were left behind. When Lotso found Daisy had replaced him, he lied to Big Baby and Chuckles, telling them that they were replaced, too. They traveled to Sunnyside, and took it over. Once Woody revealed Lotso's true nature, Big Baby realized that Lotso lied to him and throws Lotso in the dumpster. He then helps Ken and Barbie reform Sunnyside, and is last seen wearing a new outfit matching one of Ken's.

The baby who provided the voice for Big Baby is named "Woody," according to director Lee Unkrich, and the film's credits list him as Woody Smith (under "additional children's voices").

Other Sunnyside toys
Other toys at Sunnyside, with smaller roles, include:
  (voiced by John Cygan) is a green insect action figure with a bug's head, chomping mandibles, wings, and two muscular arms. He is a supporting antagonist, but later reforms. He serves as one of the toy thugs working for Lotso, and helps to reprogram Buzz and apprehend Andy's other toys. He also operates a searchlight in the playground to look out for escaped toys. He later turns against Lotso after learning of his true nature. During the credits, he is seen living in a happier Sunnyside and is shown taking a turn to endure playtime with the young children in the Caterpillar Room, switching with Chunk so he can rest.
  (voiced by Whoopi Goldberg) is a toy rubber octopus with a purple body. She is the only female member of Lotso's gang, and at first welcomes Andy's toys, but later helps capture them with her elastic arms. After they escape, she traps them near the edge of a garbage chute and is ready to push them into the dumpster, should they not admit defeat. She is then seen visibly cringing at Lotso's true character being revealed. Eventually, Lotso angrily orders Stretch to push the toys into the dumpster, which she refuses to do. Lotso is then thrown into the dumpster by Big Baby for his lies and treachery, and Stretch immediately leaves the area. In the credits, she welcomes new toys happily and is later seen sneaking a message to Woody and his friends in Bonnie's backpack.
  (voiced by Jack Angel) is an orange rock monster toy and one of Lotso's henchmen who eventually helps imprison Andy's toys. He has low intelligence, two blue eyes, and a face that can be changed by rolling it up or down to a different facial expression with red eyes. He later turns on Lotso after learning of his true nature. In the credits, he is seen enduring the abuse of the younger children, and later taking a rest while Twitch takes his place.
  (voiced by Jan Rabson) is a robot toy at Sunnyside Daycare and one of Lotso's henchmen. He only has one line, when he points out Chunk's low intelligence. He later turns against Lotso after learning of his true nature.
  (voiced by Teddy Newton) is a character based on the real-life toy of the same name. He can only speak when his receiver is lifted from its cradle. He lives in the Caterpillar Room, and has been at Sunnyside for years. He becomes an ally to Woody. When Woody returns to Sunnyside, Chatter Telephone says that coming back was a mistake because Lotso had since improved his security. He takes Woody to the window and explains that the trash chute is now the only way toys leave Sunnyside. Although his advice is to lay low, he reluctantly gives Woody instructions on how to escape Sunnyside. For this, he is later beaten and broken by Lotso's crew for helping the toys escape until he finally talks. He apologizes to Woody. In the credits, he has been repaired and is shown happily attending a toy party in the Butterfly Room.
  (voiced by Richard Kind) is a green toy worm with a built-in flashlight who wears glasses. He keeps a library of instruction manuals in a closet at Sunnyside, and gives Lotso the instruction manual for Buzz Lightyear. He later gives the same manual to Barbie (whom he mistakes for Ken since she is disguised in his spacesuit outfit). In the credits, he is seen happily using his flashlight to light a disco ball during a party at Sunnyside. He only has two lines in the film.
 A monkey toy, based on the Musical Jolly Chimp toy from the 1960s, monitors the Sunnyside Daycare security cameras at night, and can alert Lotso and his henchmen of any toys attempting to escape by screeching into a microphone to broadcast over the intercom. Chatter Telephone tells Woody that he must subdue the monkey before he and his friends can escape. Woody and Slinky manage to wrap the monkey up in adhesive tape, and subsequently lock it in a filing cabinet. In the credits, the monkey is still monitoring the security cameras, but is seen happily playing its cymbals while wearing star-shaped sunglasses.
 A jack-in-the-box toy has one line in the film when he greets Andy's toys, exclaiming, "New toys!" He is voiced by the film's director, Lee Unkrich.

Barbie
Voiced by Jodi Benson

A Barbie doll is one of the toys that Andy's sister Molly owns, until she decides to donate her to Sunnyside. She was modeled after the 1983 doll Great Shape Barbie.

At Sunnyside, Barbie meets Ken, who is as obsessed with fashion as she is. The two have a whirlwind romance and move into Ken's Dreamhouse together. Barbie later dumps Ken when she finds out he is a member of Lotso's gang. She allows herself to be imprisoned with Andy's toys, out of loyalty, and later tricks Ken into showing her some of his clothes, only to attack and tie him up and interrogate him about Lotso's schemes. She later takes a stand with Woody and the other toys against Lotso, impressing them with her articulate arguments. She and Ken reunite when he confesses his love and defects to Woody's side, claiming Barbie is not just one of "a hundred million" as Lotso says, but unique and special to him. Barbie is the only one of Andy's toys not involved in the adventure at the dump, and she, Big Baby, and Ken later take over Sunnyside Daycare and reform it from a prison to a loving, welcoming family.

Barbie has a cameo appearance in Toy Story 4 during the flashback scene in Molly's room, in which she and two other Barbies help save RC. She also appears with Ken visiting Woody's toys in Hawaiian Vacation.

Bonnie's family

Bonnie Anderson
Voiced by:
 Emily Hahn (Toy Story 3, short films, television specials)
 Madeleine McGraw (Toy Story 4)

Bonnie is one of the children who attends Sunnyside Daycare, where her mother is the receptionist. In Toy Story 3, Andy donates his toys to her before he leaves for college. In the short film Hawaiian Vacation, Bonnie goes on a vacation to Hawaii and leaves Barbie and Ken in her room. In Toy Story of Terror, she and her mother are stranded at a motel, and she later discovers the manager has been stealing her toys to sell on the internet. In The Toy Story That Time Forgot, it is revealed that Bonnie has scheduled play dates with a friend named Mason in a neighboring house. In Small Fry, Bonnie forgets Buzz in a fast-food restaurant's ball pit and does not notice that the mini-buzz has taken his place. Partysaurus Rex reveals that Bonnie has an extensive collection of bath toys, and that the regular toys fear being included in her bath time. In Toy Story 4, Bonnie creates a toy called Forky out of trash, on her first day of kindergarten.

Bonnie's mom
Voiced by Lori Alan

Bonnie's mom is the receptionist at Sunnyside Daycare and a friend of Andy's family.

In Small Fry, she takes Bonnie to a fast-food chicken restaurant named Poultry Palace and inadvertently takes the wrong Buzz Lightyear toy when they depart. In Toy Story of Terror!, she and Bonnie stay at a motel, and she calls the police to arrest the manager when she discovers he has been stealing toys from the customers to sell them online. She also appears in Toy Story 4.

Bonnie's toys
Bonnie has several toys:

  (voiced by Bud Luckey) is a brokenhearted toy clown who was once owned by Daisy (along with Lotso and Big Baby). After he, Big Baby and Lotso were lost in the countryside, Chuckles lived at Sunnyside for many years before being broken and later taken home by Bonnie. He kept the pendant that Big Baby used to wear that had Daisy's name on it, and gives it to Woody; it is later destroyed by Lotso. Chuckles returns in the short film Hawaiian Vacation and he sings a Hawaiian song while playing a ukulele when Barbie and Ken get their recreated Hawaiian adventures. He also appears in Small Fry. He does not appear in the fourth film.
  (voiced by Timothy Dalton; Robin Atkin Downes in Forky Asks a Question) is a stuffed hedgehog. He wears lederhosen and a Tyrolean hat, and views himself as an actor. Throughout Toy Story 3, he expresses great interest in theater arts and takes role playing as a child's toy very seriously. Buttercup refers to him sarcastically as "Baron von Shush" due to his habit of shushing the other toys when they break character. During the credits, he plays Romeo in a play of Romeo and Juliet, with one of the alien toys playing Juliet.
  (voiced by Kristen Schaal) is a blue toy Triceratops. She chats online with "a dinosaur toy down the street" who goes by the name "Velocistar237." During the credits, she and Rex play a game cooperatively on a computer. She is a central character in Toy Story That Time Forgot.
  (voiced by Jeff Garlin) is a stuffed white unicorn with a yellow mane and pink heart nostrils. Despite his name and appearance, he has a very gruff voice and sarcastic personality. He is the first to introduce himself to Woody when Bonnie brings him home. He later appears in the film's end credits, watching Mr. Pricklepants' play of Romeo and Juliet.
  (voiced by Bonnie Hunt) is a soft dress-up rag doll with purple hair, googly-eyes, an orange dress with buttons sewn on, and gently blushing cheeks. In the Toy Story 3 video game, she is seen as a witch.
  (voiced by Charlie Bright, Amber Kroner, and Brianna Maiwand) are three plush green peas in a green zip-up case that looks like a pea pod. They have the personalities of small children, and their names are Peaty, Peatrice, and Peanelope. The Peas-in-a-Pod reappear in the short films Hawaiian Vacation and Small Fry, voiced by Zoe Levin. They do not appear in Toy Story 4, other than the drawing of them Bonnie had from the previous film.
 Totoro is the title character from My Neighbor Totoro and the mascot of Studio Ghibli, and appears as a big plush toy. He does not speak during the film, nor is he spoken to. According to the tie-in book, The Art of Toy Story 3, Totoro's appearance in the film was intended as a tribute to Hayao Miyazaki, who is a close friend of former Pixar executive John Lasseter. In addition to Lasseter's relationship to Miyazaki, another factor that contributed to Totoro's appearance was Disney's role in dubbing Studio Ghibli films for their English-language releases. He does not appear in Toy Story 4.

Trixie, Dolly, Buttercup, and Mr. Pricklepants return in Toy Story 4 and the short films. Trixie and Mr. Pricklepants also return in the television specials.

Daisy
Daisy is a little girl who appears in flashbacks. She initially owned Lotso, Big Baby and Chuckles, but accidentally left them behind at a rest area along the road. In order to pacify her, Daisy's parents bought her another Lots-O'-Huggin' Bear rather than going to find Lotso and the rest of her toys, which made Lotso think he had been forgotten about, and changed him into a sinister, ruthless toy. Lotso lied to Big Baby, claiming Daisy replaced all of them, and made him come to Sunnyside and take it over. Chuckles keeps Big Baby's lost pendant, however, and it is revealed Big Baby still loves Daisy (much to Lotso's dismay) when he sees the pendant again.

Introduced in Toy Story 4 (2019)

Related to Bonnie

Bonnie's dad
Voiced by Jay Hernandez

Bonnie's father drives the family RV in Toy Story 4. He appears briefly in Toy Story 3, but does not have any lines, nor is his face clearly seen until Toy Story 4.

Forky

Voiced by Tony Hale

Forky is a sentient plastic spork with googly eyes, pipe cleaner arms and popsicle stick legs. He was created by Bonnie, but he does not believe that he is a toy and he hates being able to come to life. He considers himself as trash, and Woody has to prevent him from throwing himself away.

While considering names for the character, director Josh Cooley showed a picture of the character to his son and asked for a suggestion on the name. Cooley's son, approximately four years old at the time, suggested the name Fork Face, and Cooley later said "the fact that he's around the same age as Bonnie and didn't know what a spork was, I thought, 'That feels real to me.' So Forky felt like a kid would name him that."

Karen Beverly
Voiced by Melissa Villaseñor

Karen Beverly is a sentient plastic knife with googly eyes and pipe cleaner arms. Like Forky, she was created by Bonnie and initially considers herself as trash. She appears in a mid-credits scene, in which she is introduced by Jessie after Bonnie's first day in first grade. Forky instantly falls in love with her.

Carnival toys

Giggle McDimples
Voiced by Ally Maki

Giggle McDimples is a miniature toy cop who accompanies Bo Peep. She lives inside a folding compact similar in concept to Polly Pocket.

Bunny
Voiced by Jordan Peele

Bunny is a blue and green stuffed bunny with purple glitter eyes, and a carnival prize who wants to be won.

Ducky
Voiced by Keegan-Michael Key

Ducky is a stuffed duck with pink glitter eyes and a carnival prize. He is friends with Bunny, and also wants to be won.

Duke Caboom
Voiced by Keanu Reeves

Duke Caboom is an amiable Canadian daredevil toy with a white outfit, a horseshoe mustache, and a toy motorcycle. He suffers from low self-esteem due to believing that he let down his previous owner Rejean, unable to do the stunts that his commercial ads had promised. Duke Caboom is a parody of the 1975 Evel Knievel Rally Stunt Cycle by the Ideal Toy Company.

Second Chance Antiques
The following characters live in Second Chance Antiques, an antique store:

Gabby Gabby
Voiced by Christina Hendricks

Gabby Gabby is a 1950s pullstring doll with a broken voicebox, the result of a manufacturing defect, who lives in Second Chance Antiques. She serves as the main antagonist in the fourth film, having become bitter at being in the store for decades and not being wanted due to her broken voicebox. During her time in the store, she has become like a godfather, with a set of ventriloquist dummies as her henchmen. Woody eventually gives her his voice box in return for Forky's freedom and persuades her to place herself in a position for a lost young girl to find her and take her home.

According to director Josh Cooley, Gabby was inspired by the Talky Tina doll from The Twilight Zone episode "Living Doll", who in turn was inspired by the Chatty Cathy line of talking dolls. Cooley also cites Vito Corleone from The Godfather film series as an influence for Gabby's control over the dummies who served as her enforcers.

The Dummies
Voiced by Steve Purcell

The Dummies are non-speaking ventriloquist dummies who work as Gabby Gabby's minions, patrolling Second Chance Antiques. Gabby Gabby's personal aide is a dummy named Benson, the one with a red bowtie. The dummies are partially based on Slappy the Dummy. The film's producer, Mark Nielsen, said, "The dummies are, by far, some of the creepiest characters we've ever created."

Margaret
Voiced by June Squibb

Margaret is the owner of Second Chance Antiques.

Dragon
Dragon is a gray cat who lives in Second Chance Antiques and loves to destroy all toys.

Harmony
She is the granddaughter of the antique store's owner. Gabby Gabby hopes to obtain a voice box to get Harmony's attention, but even after Woody gives Gabby his voice box, Harmony still shows no interest.

Rejean
Rejean is a boy who appears in flashbacks. Duke Caboom is given to Rejean for Christmas, but because TV toy commercials greatly exaggerated Duke's abilities, Rejean becomes disappointed that Duke cannot jump through hoops, and throws Duke away on Boxing Day, believing he is defective. When Duke Caboom and Woody are on a mission to rescue Forky and Bo Peep's sheep, Duke hallucinates an angry Rejean's head watching him, and loses control.

Introduced in Lightyear (2022)

Izzy Hawthorne 
Voiced by:

 Keke Palmer
 Keira Hairston

Izzy is the granddaughter of Alisha, whom Buzz meets in the future as a result of multiple hyper-speed tests. She is the leader of Junior Zap Patrol, a volunteer team of cadets training to become protectors of the nascent society that has taken shape on the planet.

Sox 
Voiced by Peter Sohn

Sox is a robotic cat and Buzz's personal companion. A gift from Alisha after his first hyper-speed test, Sox is programmed to provide personal and emotional support for Buzz, and is equipped with a number of accessories. Despite being programmed with artificial intelligence, he occasionally shows signs of a real cat, including expressing satisfaction from being petted and getting distracted by laser pointers.

Mo Morrison 
Voiced by Taika Waititi

Mo is a naive, neurotic space cadet who Buzz befriends.

Darby Steel 
Voiced by Dale Soules

Darby is an elderly space cadet and paroled criminal who Buzz befriends. Initially serving a prison sentence, she joins the cause of Junior Zap Patrol in exchange for having her time reduced. She is an explosives expert.

Alisha Hawthorne 
Voiced by Uzo Aduba

Alisha Hawthorne was Buzz Lightyear's best friend and original Star Command partner. She is one of Izzy's grandmothers. Initially exploring the planet of T'Kani Prime with Buzz and newly recruited Featheringstam, the three of them are forced to abort after learning of the plants hostile lifeforms. Due to time dilation as a result of Buzz's multiple hyper-speed tests, Alisha dies due to old age and leaves a recording for Buzz, stating she's sorry she won't get to see him finish the mission.

Other projects

Small Fry (2011)
In the Toy Story Toons theatrical short film Small Fry (2011), a group of "Fun Meal" toys that were discarded by children have formed a support group in a storage room at Poultry Palace, a fast-food chicken restaurant. Buzz Lightyear came across them at the time when he was replaced by the Fun Meal toy version of Buzz. Among the Fun Meal toys are:

 Neptuna (voiced by Jane Lynch) is a mermaid toy from the "Mermaid Battle Squadron" line who leads the discarded Fun Meal toys support group.
 T-Bone (voiced by Angus MacLane) is a steak toy from the "Steak Force" line, which battles the "Vegetenarians."
 DJ Blu-Jay (voiced by Bret Parker) is a small blue jay toy wearing a set of headphones with a disco player with a tree trunk to stand it up.
 Lizard Wizard (voiced by Josh Cooley) is a small lime green lizard toy with a beard, a violet wizard hat and a wizard robe.
 Bozu the Ninja Clown is a combination clown and ninja.
 Vlad the Engineer (voiced by Jess Harnell) is a vampire in a conductor's hat who rides in a purple steam engine. He got discarded because "nobody wanted to board the Vampire Express."
 Gary Grappling Hook (voiced by Angus MacLane) is a green toy gun with hands and legs and a blue grappling hook for a face. Buzz uses him to escape the toy psychotherapy meeting when he was paired up with Lizard Wizard.
 Tae-Kwon Doe (voiced by Lori Alan) is an anthropomorphic karate deer toy that can chop through the boards that are part of her toy. At one point, Neptuna sees her hand up and thinks she is raising her hand. When Neptuna calls on her, Tae-Kwon Doe explains that it is simply her play feature at which point her left hoof goes down hitting the plastic boards and "breaking" it. Her name is a play on "Taekwondo".
 Super Pirate (voiced by Angus MacLane) is a pirate-themed superhero with an eyepatch on his left eye and a peg leg in place of the lower part of the left leg.
 Beef Stewardess is an anthropomorphic cow that is dressed as a stewardess.
 Nervous Sys-Tim (voiced by Kitt Hirasaki) is a clear plastic human that shows many body parts such as the brain, the eyes, and the nervous system. He was discarded because nobody wanted to see an accurate depiction of the human nervous system while eating.
 Ghost Burger (voiced by Jason Topolski) is a normal hamburger dressed in a ghost sheet.
 Koala Kopter (voiced by Carlos Alazraqui) is a plastic koala on a helicopter that has a propeller on the top of his hat that is part of the "Down Undermals" set. He was switched out for a Kangaroo Kanoe.
 Roxy Boxy (voiced by Emily Forbes) is a boxing-themed turtle. She was recalled because her boxing glove hands could come out and hurt children, making her defective. This has happened during the meeting where they hit Lizard Wizard twice.
 Recycle Ben (voiced by Peter Sohn) is a blue recycling bin with arms who says he got recycled.
 Funky Monk (voiced by Angus MacLane) is a monk with sunglasses and a gold chain with his initials around his neck.
 Condorman (voiced by Bob Bergen) is a condor-themed superhero in his vehicle. He is an allusion to the live-action 1981 Disney film of the same name.
 Franklin (voiced by Jim Ward) is a bald eagle sitting on a rolled-up version of the constitution that supports a feather pen on the back of it and the wheels are made up of quarters. He does not understand why children dislike him because "he is history, but on wheels".
 Pizza Bot (voiced by Jason Topolski) is a blue pizza box-headed robot whose right hand holds a pizza, while his left hand is a pizza cutter. It reads PIZZABOT5000 on his chest. Children do not like him for some reason, which makes him sad.

Partysaurus Rex (2012)
In Partysaurus Rex, a group of bath toys party with Rex when Bonnie and her mother go to her grandmother's house.

 Captain Suds (voiced by Corey Burton) is a boat toy with a sailor face and a headlamp who serves as the leader of the bath toys. He speaks like a pirate.
 Chuck E. Duck (voiced by Tony Cox and Don Fullilove) is a rubber duckie who serves as Captain Suds' assistant.
 Drips (voiced by Mark Walsh) is a blue whale faucet cover.
 Babs (voiced by Lori Richardson) is an octopus bath toy in a soap bar.
 Cuddles (voiced by Sherry Lynn) is an alligator bath toy who can squirt water.
 Helga Von Bubble Bath is a viking bubble bath bottle. Rex throws her in to add more bubbles in the bathtub.
 Dolphina is a pink dolphin toy that lights up. Rex knocks her in and several of her friends to create a light show.
 A toy robot with suction cups that allow it to stick to the wall, which plays music for the bath toys.

Toy Story of Terror! (2013)
The following characters appear in the television special Toy Story of Terror! (2013).

 Ron (voiced by Stephen Tobolowsky) is the greedy manager of the Sleep Well Motel. He has a habit of stealing toys from customers in his motel and selling them on the Internet, with the help of his pet iguana, Mr. Jones (non-speaking character, portrayed by Dee Bradley Baker), who snatches the toys in the middle of the night. When Bonnie and her mother went to sleep tight after their car got a flat tire, Mr. Jones steals a number of Bonnie's toys, including Woody, Buzz, and Jessie. Ron then takes pictures of the toys and puts them on his bidding sale, awaiting buyers. Jessie manages to trick Mr. Jones into tearing off a curtain, revealing the toys' location and Ron's scheme to Bonnie and her mother, who then calls the police. Two police officers later arrive to question Ron, who attempts to escape by stealing their car but is forced to flee on foot after immediately crashing it into the motel sign. The police officers initiate a manhunt for him.

The following toys were stolen from their owners during their stay at the Sleep Well motel. They eventually escape with help from Jessie, and depart the Sleep Well on a mail truck.

 Combat Carl (voiced by Carl Weathers) is a G.I. Joe-esque action figure. He is African-American in appearance, unlike the Caucasian character of the same name who briefly appeared in the first film. He is encountered by Jessie after all of her friends have been captured, having eluded Mr. Jones though losing a hand in the process. Carl is extremely paranoid and refers to himself in the third person, but later helps Jessie overcome her fears to save everyone. He was owned by a boy named Billy, to whom he is determined to return. Three Combat Carl variants later appear in Toy Story 4.
 Combat Carl Jr. (voiced by Carl Weathers) are a miniature version of Combat Carl who has a close relationship with his larger self.
 Pocketeer (voiced by Ken Marino) is part of an action figure line known as the "Fastener Four," the Pocketeer has an outfit covered in pockets in which he keeps various helpful items. His fellows Zipper Man, Snaps, and Speed Lacer were sold by Ron prior to the capture of Bonnie's toys.
 Pez Cat (voiced by Kate McKinnon) is a Pez dispenser whose head is that of a cat wearing glasses, and who serves as the lookout for the trapped toys.
 Transitron (voiced by Peter Sohn) is a Transformers-esque transforming robot who splits into five vehicle components. Jessie freed Transitron from a box he was to be shipped in and then had him seal her inside so she could rescue Woody; Transitron later joined up with the other stolen toys and departed the Sleep Well.

Toy Story That Time Forgot (2014)
The following characters appear in the television special Toy Story That Time Forgot (2014).

 Mason (voiced by R.C. Cope) is Bonnie's friend, and a post-Christmas playdate between the pair serves as the setting for the special. Mason receives a Battlesaurs toy collection for Christmas but is distracted from them by a new video game system. However, due to Trixie and Reptillus's efforts he abandons the video game and plays with his new toys. He is later shown to write his name on his toys in similar fashion to Andy and Bonnie.
 Battlesaurs are a group of mostly humanoid dinosaur toys who initially believe themselves to be real beings rather than playthings (like Buzz in the first film). This illusion is encouraged by Mason's greater interest in a new video game system that he received for Christmas, and they become hostile to Mason's other toys and to Bonnie's when they are brought over for a playdate. However, Trixie is eventually able to convince them that being played with brings its own joy, and they happily embrace their life as toys.
 Reptillus Maximus (voiced by Kevin McKidd) is the Champion of the Battlesaurs, who is fascinated by Trixie after meeting her. Initially, Reptillus is resistant to the idea of being a plaything, feeling that to submit to the will of his child would be surrender and dishonorable. However, Trixie later helps him to see that being there for Mason is honorable, and he helps her divert Mason's attention to his new toys. Near the end of Toy Story That Time Forgot, it is implied that he has a crush on Trixie. Reptillus has a cameo in Toy Story 4 as his picture is seen on a lunchbox in Bonnie's kindergarten class.
 The Cleric (voiced by Steve Purcell) is the "spiritual" leader of the Battlesaurs. The Cleric is the first Battlesaur shown to be aware of their status as toys, but conceals it from the others so that he can rule over them and Mason's other toys. However, his plans are thwarted when Reptillus sides with Trixie; he is later shown apparently enjoying his new role as Mason's plaything.
 Ray-Gon (voiced by Jonathan Kydd) is the armorer of the Battlesaurs, his main contribution is providing Trixie and Rex with battle armor, with the latter featuring remote-control arms that the Cleric uses to manipulate Rex.
 Goliathon is a large creature used by the other Battlesaurs to imprison their enemies in its belly.
 Angel Kitty (voiced by Emma Hudak) is a cat ornament on Bonnie's christmas tree. Bonnie briefly uses Angel Kitty during playtime, portraying her as a dinosaur. A running gag in the special is Angel Kitty giving a moral about Christmas much to other toys' (mostly Trixie) dismay and joy. Angel Kitty has a small horn and a halo. In her final scene, she gives a moral to Bonnie's toys and then vanishes.

References

Lists of Disney animated film characters